Euzophera fibigerella is a species of snout moth in the genus Euzophera. It was described by Jan Asselbergs in 1997 and is known from Turkey.

References

Moths described in 1997
Phycitini
Endemic fauna of Turkey
Moths of Asia